Oksana Sergeevna Akinshina (born 19 April 1987) is a Russian actress. She is best known for her roles in films Sisters (2001), Lilya 4-ever (2002), The Bourne Supremacy (2004), and Hipsters (2008).

Early life 
Oksana Akinshina was born in Leningrad, Russian SFSR, Soviet Union (now Saint Petersburg, Russia), where she currently lives. Her father was a car mechanic and her mother an accountant. She has a younger sister. At the time she landed the role in Lilya 4-ever (2002), Akishnina only spoke Russian, and communicated with director Lukas Moodysson with the help of Alexandra Dahlström as her interpreter.

Career 
Starting acting at age 12, Akinshina was discovered by Sergei Bodrov, Jr., and she made her screen début in the Russian crime film Sisters (2001), Bodrov's  own directorial début.

Her second film, Lilya 4-Ever (2001), earned her a 2002 European Film Award nomination for Best Actress.  She lost, however, to the eight actresses of the film 8 Women (2002), directed by François Ozon.  For her role in Lilya 4-Ever, she also received the award for Best Actress in Leading Role from the Guldbagge Awards, Sweden's national film awards.

Since then Akinshina has acted in the films Het Zuiden, directed by Martin Koolhoven, and The Bourne Supremacy (2004), directed by Paul Greengrass.

Personal life
From 2007 to 2010, Akinshina was married to businessman Dmitry Litvinov, with whom she has a son, Filip Litvinov, born 2 June 2009. In 2012, she remarried to film producer Archil Gelovani. Akinshina gave birth to her second child, Konstantin, on 15 January 2013 and a daughter Emmi Gelovani (b. January 25, 2017). The couple separated in 2018.

Filmography

Awards and nominations

References

External links 

 Kino-teatr.ru
 Kinopoisk.ru
 Ruskino.ru
 Kinomania.ru
 Rusactors.ru

1987 births
21st-century Russian actresses
Actresses from Saint Petersburg
Best Actress Guldbagge Award winners
Living people
Russian child actresses
Russian film actresses
Russian television actresses